A Treasury of Foolishly Forgotten Americans is a compilation of biographies by Michael Farquhar.  This was Farquhar's fifth book in a series of humorous historical outlooks.

Cast of characters
John Billington: Mayflower Murderer
Mary Dyer: Quaker Martyr
Anne Bonny: Pirate of the Caribbean
Tom Quick: “The Indian Slayer”
Mary Jemison: “The White Woman of the Genesee”
William Dawes: The Other Midnight Rider
James T. Callender: Muckraker for the First Amendment
John Ledyard: The Explorer Who Dreamed of Walking the World
Elizabeth Patterson Bonaparte: Royal American
Stephen Pleasonton: The Clerk Who Saved the Constitution (and the Declaration of Independence, Too)
Richard Mentor Johnson: The Veep Who Killed Tecumseh
Zilpha Elaw: An Unlikely Evangelist
Edwin Forrest: American Idol
Rose O’Neale Greenhow: A Spy of Grande Dame Proportion Rose O'Neal Greenhow
Clement Vallandigham: Copperhead
Mary Surratt: The Mother of Conspirators?
Tunis Campbell: Pillar of Reconstruction
Sarah Winnemucca: “Piaute Princess”
Alexander “Boss” Shepherd: The Man Who Made Washington “Worthy of the Nation” Alexander Robey Shepherd
Isaac C. Parker: “The Hanging Judge”
Hetty Green: “The Witch of Wall Street”
Oliver Curtis Perry: Outlaw of the East
Anna Jarvis: The Mother of Mother’s Day
William J. Burns: “America’s Sherlock Holmes”
Gaston B. Means: American Scoundrel Gaston Means
Louise Arner Boyd: The Socialite Who Conquered the Arctic Wilderness
Beulah Louise Henry: “Lady Edison”
Guy Gabaldon: “The Pied Piper of Saipan”
Elizabeth Bentley: “Red Spy Queen”
Dick Fosbury: Father of the Flop

Notes

References
 

American biographies
History books about the United States
2008 non-fiction books